Sekolah Menengah Kebangsaan Semera is a five-year comprehensive public secondary school in Semera Village within Asajaya, a small district within Samarahan Division which is in Sarawak, Malaysia. The school is located approximately 10 kilometres southeast of Asajaya.

SMK Semera's students are mainly from Semera, Jemukan, Iboi, Sampun and a few more areas nearby, as part of a sending/receiving relationship with the SMK Asajaya. As of 30 June 2008, the school had an enrolment of 1,584 students.

Campus 
SMK Semera consists of several parallel blocks of buildings and a corridor which connects them, and looks like extended "E" from above. Every block has windows on two sides, allowing light to pass through. This was done to save on energy costs, as the school was built during the prelude to the 1973 energy crisis. In 2007 a referendum was passed to add 8 new classrooms, an athletic training area and 2 toilets and to the original facility.

History 
The establishment of SMK Semera was suggested by PIBG members, led by Mr. Haji Taha Salleh . Before the construction of the school, students in the community had to attend secondary school in Simunjan.  Semera is a village that consists of approximately 400 students.

In 1982, PIBG and the villagers built a seven-room school building, comprising two classrooms, two offices and three teacher's quarters. The school also had to borrow two classes from a primary school - SRK Haji Kelali, Semera. SMK Semera was called SMK Sadong Hilir at that time.

In 1990 the school was moved to a new location behind the village. The name SMK Sadong Hilir was changed to SMK Semera. According to Mr. Zainuddin Kuan, Sarawak Educational Assistant Manager, the name “Semera” meant “at the same time”, for the cholera event that killed hundreds of villagers .

Curriculum

PMR 
Lower secondary students (Forms 1, 2 and 3), are prepared for the Penilaian Menengah Rendah (PMR) examination.
The subjects are:

 Bahasa Melayu
 English
 Science
 Mathematics
 History
 Geography
 Kemahiran Hidup (Living Skills)
 Pendidikan Islam (compulsory for all Muslim students)
 Mandarin / Bahasa Tamil (Optional subjects)

In addition, students also have classes of Pendidikan Moral (Moral Education), Pendidikan Jasmani dan Kesihatan (Physical Education), and Pendidikan Seni (Art). These subjects are not included in the PMR examination.

SPM 
Form 4 and Form 5 students are prepared for the Sijil Pelajaran Malaysia (SPM) examination, roughly equivalent to the British GCE O Level. Students are given the option of studying in the science stream, commerce stream, IT stream or arts stream.

Compulsory subjects 

 Malaysian language
 English
 Mathematics
 Science (For all non science-stream students)
 History
 Islamic Studies (For all Muslim students)
 Moral Studies (For all non-Muslim students)

Optional Subjects 

 Chinese language
 Tasawwur Islam

Science and Commerce Streams 

 Biology
 Chemistry
 Physics
 Additional Mathematics
 English for Science and Technology (EST)
 Additional Science
 Prinsip Akaun (Principles of Accounting)

IT Stream 
 Information Technology (IT)

Arts Stream 

 Sains Pertainian (Agricultural Science)
 Ekonomi Rumah Tangga (Home Economics)
 Ekonomi Asas (Basic Economics)
 Geography
 Pendidikan Seni Visual (Visual Arts)
 Perdagangan (Business)

STPM 
Form six, or pre-university, students are prepared for the Sijil Tinggi Persekolahan Malaysia (STPM) examination. Form six students are divided into lower 6 (half a year) and upper six (one year).

Notes

References 

 M.O.E. website
 M.O.E. website

Secondary schools in Malaysia